"Smart Girls" is a song by American musician Brian Wilson from his unofficial 1990 album Sweet Insanity. It was produced by Wilson, his former psychologist Eugene Landy, and Matt Dike. The publishing credits Wilson as the sole writer, while an original acetate credits Wilson, Landy, and Landy's girlfriend Alexandra Morgan for writing.

Content

"Smart Girls" is a hip hop pastiche containing numerous Beach Boys samples, self-quotations, and autobiographical allusions. The lyrics detail Wilson's infatuation with intelligent women as he acknowledges that his old Beach Boys songs showed only a superficial appreciation of women.

The recording was reportedly at Landy's insistence. Asked in 2015 about "Smart Girls", Wilson said, "Yeah, we were just having a good time. Yeah, it was fun. We were just kidding."

Release
Wilson and Landy, acting under the guise of their corporate banner Brains & Genius, produced a cassette single of "Smart Girls" to promote Wilson's 1991 memoir, Wouldn't It Be Nice: My Own Story. An insert that was included in the cassette stated that 250 copies were created and sent as gifts during the previous Christmas.

Reception
Author/musician Jason Hartley wrote: "What is important was that Wilson was embracing rap when many older rockers thought that rap wasn't real music. As ridiculous as 'Smart Girls' may seem to you today, at the very least, Brian Wilson was on the right side of history."

See also
"All Dressed Up for School"
"Hey Little Tomboy"
"Wipe Out" (Fat Boys/Beach Boys version)

References

Further reading
 
 

1991 songs
Songs written by Brian Wilson
Song recordings produced by Brian Wilson
Brian Wilson songs
Unreleased songs
American hip hop songs
Songs with feminist themes